Margaret Jane "Dee Dee" Myers (born September 1, 1961) is an American political analyst who served as the 19th White House Press Secretary during the first two years of the Clinton administration. She was the first woman and the second-youngest person to hold that position.
Myers later co-hosted the news program Equal Time on CNBC, and was a consultant on The West Wing. She was the inspiration for fictional White House Press Secretary C. J. Cregg. She is also the author of the 2008 New York Times best-selling book, Why Women Should Rule the World. In 2020, she joined the Gavin Newsom administration as Senior Advisor to the Governor and Director of the Governor’s Office of Business and Economic Development.

Personal life
Margaret Jane Myers was born in 1961 at Quonset Point in North Kingstown, Rhode Island, to Stephen and Judy Myers. Her nickname, "Dee Dee", originated when her sister could not pronounce "baby." Myers spent most of her formative years in Valencia, Santa Clarita, California. Her father was a Navy aviator  who completed two tours of duty in the Vietnam War, and her mother worked as a real estate agent. Myers is a graduate of William S. Hart High School and Santa Clara University (1983).

She met her husband, Todd Purdum, the national editor for Vanity Fair, former White House correspondent, and Los Angeles bureau chief for The New York Times, during the 1992 presidential campaign. The couple married in 1997, have two children, Kate and Stephen, and live in Los Angeles, California.

Political career
Myers' career in political communications began shortly after graduating from college, taking a full-time role on the 1984 presidential campaign of Walter Mondale. She later served as a field representative for California State Senator Art Torres, and as assistant press secretary in the office of Los Angeles Mayor Tom Bradley and on his 1986 campaign for California governor. She was also a spokesperson for Michael Dukakis' 1988 presidential bid and Dianne Feinstein's 1990 California gubernatorial campaign, and served as campaign manager for Frank Jordan's 1991 run for San Francisco mayor.

Clinton years
Myers joined Bill Clinton's presidential campaign team in 1991 and, following the 1992 presidential election, was named Clinton's first White House Press Secretary, a role she held from January 20, 1993, to December 22, 1994. She was the first woman to serve in that position, as well as being the second-youngest overall, having taken the job at the age of 31. Myers is sometimes cited as the youngest-ever White House Press Secretary; however, Ron Ziegler, Richard Nixon's press secretary, was 29 when he assumed the role in January 1969.

According to the Detroit Free Press, Myers earned a reputation for her "humour and patience" in handling the White House press corps, often delivering "quick one-liners" while issuing daily press briefings. Until September 1994, when she was given the title of Assistant to the President, she held the lesser title of "deputy assistant" and had a lower salary than previous White House Press Secretaries. She also lacked consistent access to Clinton's inner circle. This was frequently noted in news coverage about Myers throughout her term, and is addressed in her 2008 book, Why Women Should Rule The World.

Post-White House career
After the Clinton administration, she became a political analyst and commentator, appearing on television and speaking at events on politics and the media.

Television and popular culture
In May 1995, Myers became the co-host of political talk show Equal Time on CNBC. She initially hosted the show opposite Mary Matalin, and later opposite Bay Buchanan. In 1997, she was the winning contestant on an episode of Celebrity Jeopardy!, beating Robert F. Kennedy, Jr. and Representative Jesse Jackson, Jr. Myers has also appeared as a guest on other television programs, including The Today Show, Charlie Rose, and ABC's Nightline. She also appeared as herself in the 1997 Robert Zemeckis film, Contact.

Writer Aaron Sorkin recruited Myers to serve as a consultant and script advisor on the Emmy Award-winning TV series The West Wing, beginning in 1999. The character of C. J. Cregg (played by Allison Janney), the White House Press Secretary on the series, was partially inspired by Myers. News articles have also reported that she may have served as the basis for the character of Daisy Green in the novel and film Primary Colors, played by Maura Tierney.

Commentator
Myers has contributed to Vanity Fair since July 1995, originally as a Washington editor, and since 1997 as a contributing editor. She is the author of the 2008 New York Times best-selling book Why Women Should Rule The World, about women taking on positions of leadership and her own experiences in the White House. Her writings have also appeared in a number of other publications, including the Los Angeles Times, The New York Times, Time, The Washington Post, O: the Oprah Magazine, Politico, and The Huffington Post. Since leaving the White House, Myers has also been invited to speak at numerous events, usually on the topics of women's issues, the media and politics. In 2011, she became a brand ambassador for Jones New York's Empower your Confidence campaign, and appeared as a model in advertisements for the brand.

Public affairs consulting
Myers joined The Glover Park Group in September 2010, as a managing director of public affairs. Her role at the firm involves consulting with clients on communications strategy, marketing and reputation management. In January 2013 she was the spokeswoman for Paula Broadwell during the Petraeus scandal.

Corporate communications
In September 2014, Myers became the head of corporate communications at Warner Bros. She departed from this position in February 2020.

References

External links

 First press briefing, Dee Dee Myers, January 28, 1993
 Final press briefing, Dee Dee Myers, December 22, 1994
 Dee Dee Myers  Video produced by Makers: Women Who Make America
 

1961 births
Clinton administration personnel
CNBC people
Living people
People from North Kingstown, Rhode Island
People from Valencia, Santa Clarita, California
Santa Clara University alumni
White House Press Secretaries